Panthea is a genus of the owlet moth family, Noctuidae. The word Panthea is from Greek, meaning "all of gods" .

Species
Panthea acronyctoides – Black zigzag, tufted spruce caterpillar
Panthea apanthea
Panthea coenobita
Panthea furcilla – Eastern panthea, tufted white pine caterpillar
Panthea gigantea
Panthea greyi
Panthea grisea
Panthea guatemala
Panthea hoenei (Draudt 1950)
Panthea judyae
Panthea reducta
Panthea roberti (de Johannis, 1928)
Panthea virginarius – Cascades panthea

References

External links
Revision of the New World Panthea Hübner (Lepidoptera, Noctuidae) with descriptions of 5 new species and 2 new subspecies
Panthea at funet

Pantheinae